The Kingdom of the Algarve (Portuguese: Reino do Algarve, from the Arabic Gharb al-Andalus ), after 1471, Kingdom of the Algarves (Portuguese: Reino dos Algarves), was a nominal kingdom within the Kingdom of Portugal, located in the southernmost region of continental Portugal, until the end of the monarchy in 1910.

It was a dominion of the Portuguese Crown and supposedly a kingdom apart from Portugal, though in fact the "Algarvian kingdom" had no institutions, special privileges, or autonomy. The Algarve was politically very similar to the rest of the Portuguese provinces, and "King of the Algarve" was just an honorific title, based on the Algarve's history as the last area of Portugal to be conquered from the Moors during the Portuguese Reconquista. 

The title King of Silves was first used by Sancho I of Portugal after the first conquest of the Algarvian city of Silves in 1189. At the time of his grandson, Afonso III of Portugal (1210 – 1279), the rest of the Algarve had finally been conquered, so "King of Portugal and the Algarve" then became a part of the titles and honours of the Portuguese Crown.

History

Reconquista
During the Reconquista, Portuguese and Castilian conquests went south, to retake lands that had been conquered by Muslim armies in the 8th century. Portugal conquered and secured much of its southern borders during the reigns of King Sancho II of Portugal and King Afonso III of Portugal.

First conquest
In 1189, King Sancho I of Portugal conquered Silves, one of the most prosperous cities in Al-Andalus, aligned at the time with the Almohad Caliphate. Portuguese control over Silves would be short, with the Almohads conquering the city again in 1191 in a massive counter-attack led by Abu Yusuf Yaqub al-Mansur the Almohad Caliph in person.

The conquest of the Algarve

With the decline of the Almohads, the southern taifa city-states united under a single Emir, Mûsâ Ibn Muhammad Ibn Nassir Ibn Mahfûz, former governor of Niebla, and known among the Christians as Aben Mafom.

Ibn Mafûz, King of Niebla and Emir of the Algarve, trying to counter the achievements of the Portuguese in their territories, declared himself a vassal to Alfonso X of Castile (who thus titled himself the King of the Algarve). Through his vassals, Alfonso X hoped to claim dominion over the Algarve not yet conquered by the Portuguese.

The Emir's vow of vassalage to Castille however did not stop the knights of the Order of Santiago, under the command of the Grand-Master Paio Peres Correia, from conquering most of the region city by city, between 1242 and 1249, including Silves. In March 1249, King Afonso III of Portugal captured Faro, the last Muslim stronghold in Algarve, ending the Portuguese Reconquista.

The entitlement of Afonso III of Portugal as King of Portugal and the Algarve would serve as a reaction to Alfonso X of Castile's claim to the Algarve, and was designed to demonstrate the rights of the Portuguese monarch in the region concerned.

The issue between the sovereigns of Castille and Portugal was eventually settled by the Treaty of Badajoz (1267), where King Alfonso X gave up his claims of the Algarve, making his grandson Dinis the heir to the throne of the Algarve, which dictated the terms of its incorporation into the Portuguese crown. The treaty, though, allowed the use of the title of King of the Algarve by King Alfonso X and his descendants, since King Alfonso X had acquired the territories of Al-Gharb Al-Andalus on the other side of the Guadiana river. The kings of Castile, and then Spain, would add the title to their repertoire of titles until the ascent of Queen Isabel II of Spain to the throne.

Age of Discovery
During the Age of Discovery, many voyages started from the Algarve, mainly those funded by Prince Henry the Navigator (Infante D. Henrique). Prince Henry also set up his school of navigation at Sagres Point, though the idea of a real school building and campus is highly disputed. Most of the voyages set sail from Lagos.

The Algarves of either side of the sea in Africa
The name of the Algarvian Kingdom suffered some minor changes due to the Portuguese North African conquests, which were considered an extension of the kingdom of the Algarve. John I of Portugal added to the title of "King of Portugal and the Algarve", the title "Lord of Ceuta", and his grandson Afonso V of Portugal, in turn, styled himself "Lord of Ceuta and Alcacer-Ceguer in Africa" (after 1458). The 1471 conquest of Asilah, Tangiers and Larache, together with North African previous holdings, led to the creation of the title "the Algarves from either side of the sea in Africa" (Algarve d’além-mar), leaving the European Algarve to become "the Algarve behind the sea" (Algarve d’aquém-mar).

Thus, it was not until 1471 that "the Kingdom of the Algarve" led to "the Kingdom of the Algarves", due to the increase of Portuguese possessions in Northern Africa, which were made as possessions of the Kingdom of the Algarve. The Portuguese monarchs therefore adopted the title that they would use until the fall of the monarchy in 1910: "Kings of Portugal and the Algarves of either side of the sea in Africa". The title would continue to be used even after the abandonment of the last North African holding in Mazagan (Portuguese: Mazagão; lost by Portugal in 1769).

19th-century conflicts

During the 19th century, a serious clash between pro-constitutionalism liberals and pro-absolutism antiliberals, caused the a civil war in Portugal (1828-1834), and in Algarve an exodus of people from the Algarvian inlands to the coastal cities. José Joaquim Sousa Reis, an antiliberal known as Remexido, fought in the inlands and attacked the coastal cities, bringing the urban population into turmoil. The turmoil of the Algarve intensified in the years between 1834 and 1838, when the Algarve saw battles on a level it had never seen before. On November 26, 1836, Miguel I of Portugal, already defeated and living in exile, named Remexido Governor of the Kingdom of the Algarve and Acting Commander in Chief of all the Royalist Troops, Regular and Irregular Armies, and the Operations in the South. Remexido, however, was captured near São Marcos da Serra and shot in Faro on August 2, 1838, after being subjected to a summary trial.

See also
 Kingdom of Portugal
 United Kingdom of Portugal, Brazil and the Algarves
 Algarve
 Gharb al-Andalus
Portuguese Inquisition in Goa and Bombay-Bassein

References

 
Kingdom of Portugal
History of the Algarve
History of Ceuta
Algarve
Algarve
Algarve
Algarve
Kingdom the Algarve
Kingdom the Algarve
Kingdom the Algarve
States and territories established in the 1180s
States and territories disestablished in 1910
1189 establishments in Europe
12th-century establishments in Portugal
1910 disestablishments in Portugal
1st millennium in Portugal